Bokkala Kishore Kumar (born 19 September 1977), known professionally as Vennela Kishore, is an Indian actor and director who works in Telugu-language films. Known for his comic roles, he was given the moniker "Vennela" after his first feature film Vennela (2005). He is a recipient of two Nandi Awards, two SIIMA Awards and one IIFA Utsavam Award.

Early life 
Kishore was born and brought up in Kamareddy of present-day Telangana. He moved to Hyderabad for graduation and then emigrated to the US for higher studies. Kishore completed his master's degree in Ferris State University, Michigan and started as a software engineer.

Career
During his stay in the U.S., Kishore got an opportunity to work in Deva Katta's directorial Vennela (2005) which marked his entry to the film industry.

Kishore received appreciation for his role "Akella Vigneswara Rao" in the film DJ. His other performances include Bindaas, Pilla Zamindar, Daruvu, Sarkaru Vaari Paata, Badshah, Doosukeltha, Pandaga Chesko, Goodachari, S/O Satyamurthy,  Srimanthudu, Bale Bale Magadivoy, Ekkadiki Pothavu Chinnavada, and Ami Thumi. He also directed two Telugu films (Vennela 1½, and Jaffa). After tasting failure with his directorial projects, he has returned to acting.

Filmography

As an actor

As a director

Awards and nominations

References

External links

Living people
Male actors from Telangana
Indian male comedians
Male actors in Telugu cinema
Indian male film actors
Telugu comedians
21st-century Indian male actors
1980 births
People from Nizamabad, Telangana
Ferris State University alumni
South Indian International Movie Awards winners
Santosham Film Awards winners
Nandi Award winners
International Indian Film Academy Awards winners